Glen Rogers may refer to:

 Glen Edward Rogers (born 1962), American serial killer
 Glen Rogers, West Virginia, an unincorporated community in Wyoming County, West Virginia, United States